Helsya Maeisyaroh (born 7 May 2005) is an Indonesian footballer who plays as a midfielder for Persis Women and the Indonesia women's national team.

Club career

Arema
In February 2022, Helsya signed a contract with Liga 1 Putri club Arema Putri.

Persis
In mid 2022, Persis Solo founded their women's team. Helsya was one of many players announced in May 2022 for their first season.

International career
Helsya represented Indonesia at the 2022 AFC Women's Asian Cup.

On 10 October 2022, Helsya scored her debut goal against Singapore from the kick-off distance, in the 92nd minute of the match, in a 2-1 win in a friendly match.

International goals

Honours

Club
Arema
 Pertiwi Cup 3rd place: 2021–22

Individual
 Liga 1 Putri Best Young Player: 2019

References

External links

2005 births
Living people
People from Bekasi
Sportspeople from West Java
Indonesian women's footballers
Women's association football midfielders
Indonesia women's youth international footballers
Indonesia women's international footballers